María Delfina González Valenzuela (1912, El Salto, Jalisco, Mexico – 17 October 1968, Irapuato, Guanajuato, México), María del Carmen González Valenzuela (1918–1969), María Luisa González Valenzuela (1920 – 19 November 1984, Irapuato, Guanajuato, México) and María de Jesús González Valenzuela (1924 – 1990), known as Las Poquianchis, were four sisters from the north-central Mexican state of Guanajuato. From 1950 until 1964, the sisters ran "Rancho El Ángel"', the locus of their largescale prostitution ring and the site of the murder of at least 91 people, but it is believed that the four sisters killed more than 150 people or even more than 200 people. Guinness World Records called them the "most prolific murder partnership".

Biography

The police picked up a woman named Josefina Gutiérrez, a procuress, on suspicion of kidnapping young girls in the Guanajuato city area, and during questioning, she implicated the González sisters. Police officers searched the sisters' property near the city of San Francisco del Rincón and found the bodies of eighty women, eleven men, and several fetuses. Investigations revealed that the sisters' criminal operation recruited prostitutes through deceptive help-wanted ads for housemaids. Many of the girls were force-fed heroin or cocaine. The sisters killed the prostitutes when they became too ill, damaged by repeated sexual activity, lost their looks, or stopped pleasing the customers.

They would also kill customers who showed up with large amounts of cash. When asked for an explanation for the deaths, one of the sisters reportedly said, "The food didn't sit well with them." Tried in 1964, the González sisters were each sentenced to forty years in prison. In prison, Delfina died due to an accident where a construction worker heard her and tried to catch a glimpse at the serial murderer before accidentally dumping cement on her head, and María finished her sentence and dropped out of sight after her release. Although they are often cited as the killers, there were two other sisters who helped in their crimes, Carmen and María Luisa. Carmen died of cancer whilst still in prison; María Luisa went mad because she feared that she would be killed by angry protesters.

The sisters and their crimes were dramatized in the Felipe Cazals film Las Poquianchis (1976) and the Jorge Ibargüengoitia novel Las Muertas (1977).

See also
List of serial killers by country
Most prolific murderers by number of victims

References

Bibliography
Peter Vronsky: Female Serial Killers: How and Why Women Become Monsters, Berkley Books, New York (2007), p. 440

External links

Criminal duos
Date of birth missing
Date of death unknown
Female organized crime figures
Forced prostitution
Human trafficking in Mexico
Mexican brothel owners and madams
Mexican female serial killers
Mexican people convicted of murder
Mexican pimps
Mexican sex workers
People convicted of murder by Mexico
Sibling quartets
Year of birth missing